Selwyn College, Cambridge (formally Selwyn College in the University of Cambridge) is a constituent college of the University of Cambridge. The college was founded in 1882 by the Selwyn Memorial Committee in memory of George Augustus Selwyn (1809–1878), the first Bishop of New Zealand (1841–1868), and subsequently Bishop of Lichfield (1868–1878). Its main buildings consist of three courts built of stone and brick (Old Court, Ann's Court, and Cripps Court). There are several secondary buildings, including adjacent townhouses and lodges serving as student hostels on Grange Road, West Road and Sidgwick Avenue. The college has some 60 fellows and 110 non-academic staff.

In 2019, Selwyn was ranked eighth on the Tompkins Table of Cambridge colleges in order of undergraduates' performances in examinations, having been first in 2008. The college was ranked 16th out of 30 in an assessment of college wealth conducted by the student newspaper Varsity in November 2006. Selwyn's sister college at the University of Oxford is Keble College.

History

George Augustus Selwyn 

The college was founded following the death of Bishop George Augustus Selwyn, who had played an important role in the establishment of New Zealand as its first bishop. Selwyn was a scholar of St John's College, Cambridge, and a member of the Cambridge crew which competed in the inaugural Boat Race in 1829. He came out second in the Classical Tripos in 1831, graduating Bachelor of Arts (BA) 1831, Master of Arts (MA Cantab) 1834, and Doctor of Divinity (DD) per lit. reg. 1842, and was a fellow of St John's College from 1833 to 1840.

After graduating, Selwyn first taught at Eton College. In 1833, he was ordained deacon, and, in 1834, a priest. Selwyn displayed leadership talent and, in 1841, after an episcopal council held at Lambeth had recommended the appointment of a bishop for New Zealand, Charles James Blomfield, Bishop of London, offered the post to Selwyn.

He returned to England in 1867, and accepted the post of Bishop of Lichfield, which he held until his death on 11 April 1878, aged 69.

Foundation of the College 

After Selwyn's death in 1878, a number of scholars from Cambridge launched plans to establish a college to honour his life. The Selwyn Memorial Committee was founded with Charles Abraham (Bishop of Wellington) as secretary, and it proposed that a Cambridge college should be established as a memorial. The college's first Master, Arthur Lyttelton, was formally elected on 10 March 1879, the Archbishop of Canterbury Archibald Tait was invited to become Visitor on 28 June 1878 and building of Old Court, as it is now known, began in 1880. 

The foundation stone of the college was laid by Edward Herbert, 3rd Earl of Powis in a ceremony on 1 June 1881, following a lunch in King's College, Cambridge. A Charter of Incorporation was granted by Queen Victoria on 13 September 1882, and the west range of Old Court was ready for use by the college's official opening (with the Master's installation) on 10 October 1882, in time for Michaelmas term. Selwyn's first 28 undergraduates joined the original master and 12 other Fellows at the then Public Hostel of the university in 1882.

The first master of the college was Arthur Lyttelton, who sought to establish the college on a firm academic and financial foundation. Lyttelton had been senior tutor at Keble College, Oxford. He came from a well-established family with strong connections in both Church and State, his mother being the sister-in-law of the prime minister, William Ewart Gladstone, who became a major benefactor of the college. Lyttelton was himself a life-long supporter of the Liberal party and was familiar with many politicians in Westminster, his wife Kathleen, a women's activist, being the daughter of the Liberal MP George Clive. Lyttelton persuaded Gladstone to make a personal gift to the college of the louder of the two chapel bells. Gladstone reportedly believed that Cambridge students needed to be well woken if they were to get up at a productive time in the morning. Today, the chapel bell is known as 'Gladstone's Bell' by students.

The college was founded by donations and subscriptions, with a distinctly religious character. The royal charter for the college, reproducing the terms of the charter of Keble College, was sealed on 13 September 1882. The charter declared that the college was "founded and constituted with the especial object and intent of providing persons desirous of academic education and willing to live economically with a College wherein sober living and high culture of the mind may be combined with Christian training based upon the principles of the Church of England". Initially, only baptised Christians were accepted as students or scholars. The original foundation charter specified that the college should "make provision for those who intend to serve as missionaries overseas and ... educate the sons of clergymen".

Selwyn was not yet a full college of the university, but a "Public Hostel", with its undergraduates regarded as non-collegiate and marked with the designation "H. Selw." on Senate House lists.

Later development 

In 1926 the "Public Hostel" status was abolished, replaced with that of "Approved Foundation", granting more security to the college.  The distinction of the college as "H. Selw." on Senate House lists had also ceased from June 1924.

On 14 March 1958, Selwyn was granted full collegiate status.

Selwyn, in common with most other Oxford and Cambridge colleges, originally admitted only men, but was one of the first colleges to become mixed when women were admitted from 1976. In that year, women lived only on E and H Staircases, but in subsequent years could live anywhere in College. In 1999, Selwyn appointed the first female Director of Music in an Oxbridge College, Sarah MacDonald, and in 2009, Selwyn became the first Cambridge college to appoint a female head porter, Helen Stephens.

Development

The college founders purchased from Corpus Christi College  of land which lay between Grange Road, West Road and Sidgwick Avenue on 3 November 1879 at a cost of £6,111 9s 7d. This parcel of land is still owned by the college and is the location of Old Court and Ann's Court. The site was originally considered somewhat remote from the centre of the university, but Selwyn now neighbours the Sidgwick Site where several of the university's arts and humanities faculties are.  An alternative site on Lensfield Road, where Our Lady and the English Martyrs Church now stands, was considered but rejected as too small.

The chapel was built in 1895 before the dining hall (in 1909), and chapel attendance was compulsory for students from the college's foundation until 1935. There were originally plans to build a permanent library between F Staircase and the chapel to complete Old Court, on land that now forms part of the College Gardens, but this was not done. The Selwyn College Library was opened in 1929, funded by subscriptions in honour of college members who had died in the First World War. In 1894 and 1896, respectively, the Old Library in the tower, received two extensive benefactions of history, politics and theological texts, from Canon William Cooke and Edward Wheatley-Balme. These large literary bequests gave Selwyn College an excellent working library.

The Jacobean-style Dining Hall was constructed under the tenure of the fourth Master of Selwyn College, Richard Appleton, who had previously been a senior fellow of Trinity College, Cambridge. His appointment as Master continued the close relationship between Selwyn and Trinity which had been supportive of the younger college. Appleton served for two years from 1907 before he died of influenza. Despite his brief mastership, Appleton had managed to secure funding for the Dining Hall. Appleton's initials and rebus (three apples and a tun) appear on the north wall of the Hall entrance, and his posthumously painted portrait hangs in the college. Construction on the dining hall began in 1909, but Appleton did not live to see the project completed.

The dining hall was always intended to be panelled, however, this vision could not be realised until the woodwork for the west side of the hall was presented in 1913 by the Magdalene fellow, A. C. Benson in memory of his father Archbishop Benson. This panelling came from the English Church in Rotterdam which was designed by the office of Sir Christopher Wren between 1699 and 1708.

University education was expensive at the time of Selwyn's foundation, and given that Selwyn College was intended to be a place for young students who could not otherwise afford an Oxbridge education, the college charges were initially kept low. Undergraduates initially paid £27 per term for food, lodgings, lectures and tuition, with a small surcharge for students of medicine, scientists and engineers. This was raised to £28 in 1916, and £33 in 1918, as the number of scholars studying at Oxford and Cambridge drastically decreased due to the First World War.

Buildings and grounds

Old Court, construction of which began in 1880 and is built in Ketton stone and local red brick in the Victorian Late Perpendicular Gothic Revival style, was largely designed by Sir Arthur Blomfield and comprises seven staircases (A to G), together with a tower and gateway, Master's Lodge, Chapel, Hall, Kitchens, Music Practice Room and Archives. Selwyn College Library is located adjacent to Old Court; it was designed by T. H. Lyon in 1929 to serve as a First World War memorial.

Cripps Court, named after the Cripps Foundation that donated most of the funds to build it (and which also funded developments at St John's College, Queens' College and Magdalene College) was built and formally opened on 17 May 1969 on land on the opposite side of Grange Road which was originally owned by Jesus College. Selwyn's Cripps Court features a tricolon design with ensuite rooms for students. Cripps Court comprises a further seven staircases (H to N) and is home to all of Selwyn's first-year undergraduates, a few second-year undergraduates and postgraduates including their common room, the Middle Combination Room (MCR).

Ann's Court, built on the land to the north of Old Court and south of West Road, is the most recent court. Its exterior reflects the atmosphere of the rest of the college with Ketton limestone and brick-work fixtures. Ann's Court was designed by the traditionalist architect Demetri Porphyrios who has completed similar new projects at Magdalen College, Oxford, which also utilised hand-carved Ketton stone in its exteriors, and at Princeton University (Whitman College) in the United States. The golden-yellow Ketton stone used in Ann's Court (and the rest of Selwyn College) has been used in the construction of Oxford and Cambridge colleges for several hundred years, and can be seen in the exterior of the Wren Library at Trinity College. The interior of Ann's Court is contemporary and equipped with wooden staircases. As a proponent of New Classical Architecture, Porphyrios designed new buildings which fit the existing limestone and brick materials of Selwyn College. The Porphyrios Associates design involved a three-winged building which created the space for a large new court to be formed in the middle of the college, named Centre Court. Ann's Court features hand-carved details and a series of limestone cloisters and chimneys arranged in the traditional Cambridge University fashion. Ann's Court was named after Ann Dobson, who with her husband Christopher Dobson (who matriculated at Selwyn in 1957) formed the Ann Dobson Foundation, which is one of the principal donors towards the construction costs of Phases I and II. Phase I was completed in July 2005 and consists of 43 ensuite rooms and 15 administrative offices, forming two staircases (O and P) at a cost of £7.5 million. The second phase, including 40 en-suite bedrooms forming staircases Q and R and a new Junior Combination Room (JCR) at a cost of £2.5 million, was completed in Summer 2009. The college bar was refurbished in 2002, and redecorated in 2011.

The college has planning permission to develop further three phases of building, planned to be built as funding permits, which will extend the college's distinctive limestone and red-brick façade along Grange Road to the corner of West Road. The plans consist of a new library and archives (Phase 3) behind Staircase E of Old Court, and two further accommodation blocks (Phase 4) to form a new court (tentatively named Library Court) between Old Court and Ann's Court, and an auditorium, debate chamber, and conference facilities (Phase 5) to complete the west side of Ann's Court.

Plans are currently underway to build a new library and auditorium located near Ann's Court and the College Gardens. The college plan calls for all future expansions to adhere to the same architectural style of limestone and brick demonstrated in the Ann's Court development. The Master Plan, also designed by Porphyrios Architects, calls for a new wing of student housing alongside Grange Road, located between Old Court and Ann's Court. This new wing of accommodation would enclose the western edge of Centre Court and would allow the college to increase graduate student numbers. In 2018, the college assured concerned alumni and students that the original library would be preserved and converted into lecture and auditorium rooms (although the small 1970s annex will probably be removed). The building of a new library is a priority for Selwyn College and would complete the perimeter of a fourth collegiate court.

Coat of arms and motto

The Selwyn College coat of arms incorporates the arms of the Selwyn family impaled with an adaptation of the arms of the Diocese of Lichfield. The arms were granted in the 1960s and are emblazoned as follows;

Per pale Gules and Argent a Cross potent quadrate Argent and Or between four crosses paty those to the dexter Argent those to the sinister Or For the See of Lichfield impaling Argent on a Bend cotised Sable three Annulets Or for Selwyn all within a Bordure Sable And for Crest On a Wreath Or & Purpure In front of a Book erect bound Gules edged clasped and garnished Or a representation of the Pastoral Staff of Bishop Selwyn.

The dexter half of the arms adapted from those of the See of Lichfield, are unusual, with or (gold) countercharged on argent (silver), violating the rule of tincture, which prohibits a metal to be charged with another metal. This is thought to refer to the arms of the Kingdom of Jerusalem, which also violates this rule. Selwyn's pastoral staff or crozier is based on a hardwood Māori staff which is held in the College Chapel. The college was also granted an official badge, A Mitre Or within an Annulet Purpure.

Before an official grant by the College of Arms, Selwyn College used arms believed to be those borne by George Augustus Selwyn as Bishop of Lichfield; they are displayed above the main gateway, built in 1881, and on the Common Seal, first used in 1882.

The college motto is a biblical quotation from 1 Corinthians, chapter 16, verse 13, in Greek, ΑΝΔΡΙΖΕΣΘΕ (andrízesthe), translated in the King James Version as "Quit ye like men" (alternatively, in the Douay–Rheims version, "Do manfully" or, in the New American Bible, "Be courageous"). A longer extract of the verse, "ΣΤΗΚΕΤΕ ΕΝ ΤΗ ΠΙΣΤΕΙ ΑΝΔΡΙΖΕΣΘΕ", is carved over the main College gate (the full Greek verse of 1 Corinthians 16:13 being "Γρηγορεῖτε, στήκετε ἐν τῇ πίστει, ἀνδρίζεσθε, κραταιοῦσθε·"; Grēgoreîte, stḗkete en têi pístei, andrízesthe, krataioûsthe).

Traditions

Formal hall

Selwyn holds Formal Hall on every Tuesday and Thursday evening during Term at 7:30 pm with a capacity of 120, tickets for which can be bought by students for themselves and up to two guests. An additional Formal Hall was held on Sunday evenings at least until the early 1990s. There is also a special, extra Halfway Hall Formal for second-year students to mark the middle of their time as undergraduate students at the college, and a Christmas Formal for all students at the end of every Michaelmas Term. Selwyn holds several JCR Dinners and MCR Dinners specifically for undergraduate and graduate students each term.

Formal Halls are for students, Fellows and the Master of the college; however, members of other Oxbridge colleges may attend, as well as a limited number of guests from outside the university. Formal hall meals are three- or four-course meals which are fully catered and served à la carte by college staff. During formal hall, the fellows and the master of the college sit at the High Table near the front of the hall, while students sit on benches or chairs at the long tables.

Latin grace
The college Grace is recited in Latin by a Fellow or Scholar (a student who achieved a First Class mark overall in the previous year) at the beginning of Formal Hall, and is as follows:
Benedic, Domine, nobis et donis Tuis, quae de Tua largitate sumus sumpturi; et concede ut iis muneribus Tuis ad laudem Tuam utamur, gratisque animis fruamur, per Jesum Christum Dominum nostrum. Amen.

Translation:
Bless us, O Lord, and all thy gifts, which of thy goodness we are about to enjoy; grant that we may use these generosities to thy glory, and enjoy them with thankful hearts, through Jesus Christ our Lord. Amen.

When the High Table rises, the following concluding Grace is said Benedicamus Domino (Let us bless the Lord), with the response being Laus Deo (Praise be to God). This response was changed in the 1990s, from the previous response Deo gratias (Thanks be to God).

Loyal toast
Selwyn has a tradition in which senior fellows and members of the college commonly remain seated for the college's loyal toast during formal hall. This tradition is not observed out of disrespect or irreverence for the sovereign, but rather, out of courtesy and remembrance of the former Master of the college, John Selwyn, who could not easily stand for the loyal toast owing to the limited use of his legs in later life. John Selwyn (son of George Augustus Selwyn) served as the second Master of Selwyn College (1893–1898).

Lecture series
Selwyn College hosts an annual lecture named in honour of Ramsay Murray, an alumnus of the college during the 1930s. The Ramsay Murray Lecture Series was established in 1994 following a significant bequest from the Murray estate. Lecturers have included many high-profile politicians, academics, and journalists including Onora O’Neill, Niall Ferguson, Michael Howard, Ian Kershaw, Roy Porter, Ian Clark, Lawrence Freedman, David Cannadine, Keith Thomas, Jonathan Riley-Smith and Quentin Skinner, former Regius Professor of Modern History. The 2018 Ramsay Murray lecture features the journalist Frank Gardner. The lectures are free and open to the public.

Student life

Selwyn has a reputation as one of the most traditional but friendliest Oxbridge colleges. The college is visited by many members of the university who come from the neighbouring Sidgwick Site in-between lectures and supervisions to take advantage of Selwyn's Servery and Dining Hall. Similarly, Formal Swaps are regularly arranged by the student councils to allow students from other Oxford and Cambridge colleges to dine at Selwyn during Formal Hall. Students of Selwyn College are required to wear their gowns to all formal halls, ceremonies and college functions. The Selwyn gown is made of a thick black cloth with dark navy blue inline lapels.

Common rooms
Selwyn College Junior Combination Room (JCR) is the students' union for undergraduates students. Elected in Michaelmas term, it organises social and welfare events, negotiates with the college on the students' behalf, and represents Selwyn on Cambridge University Students' Union (CUSU) Council. JCR is affiliated to CUSU and by extension to the National Union of Students. In recent years, four presidents of Selwyn College JCR have become CUSU president, one of whom, Wes Streeting MP, went on to become president of the National Union of Students and a Labour Member of Parliament (MP). Another JCR President, Simon Hughes went on to become a Liberal Democrat MP and candidate for Mayor of London.

The Middle Combination Room (MCR) comprises the graduate students of Selwyn College, and is similarly represented by the MCR Committee (MCRc). The MCR is located in Cripps Court. The presidents and treasurers of the JCRc and MCRc have sat on College Council, the main decision-making body of the college, since it was reformed in 1989.

Student societies
The college is host to a number of student organisations, including the Hermes Club, Selwyn College Music Society and Selwyn Jazz, and on the stage by amateur dramatics society The Mighty Players. Selwyn College Boat Club is the official rowing club. Selwyn has the longest continually running students' magazine— of any Cambridge College; Kiwi has been published from 1982 to present.

The chapel choir is a mixed choir that sings three weekly services during full term, has toured widely and has made over 15 commercial CD recordings under their professional director, Sarah MacDonald. The Choir has also included members of the neighbouring women's college, Newnham College, since before the integration of women to Selwyn.

Unofficial societies
Like many Oxbridge colleges, Selwyn is home to several secret societies and dining clubs including The Controversialists, The Cromwells, and The Templars. Some of these societies function as de facto discussion and debate clubs while others are better known as drinking societies and for raucous parties. In recent years, several of the secret societies at Selwyn have been accused of elitism, and have been involved in sexism and hazing scandals. In 2014, members of the Selwyn Templars were involved in a scandal where sexist and misogynistic messages were sent out to members of the society.

The Controversialists
The Controversialists are the oldest secret society at the college and one of the oldest at the university, being founded by a group of all-male students during the Lent Term in 1893. The society's name is believed to pay homage to both their leftist political leanings and their discussion and debate of poetry and literature. The purpose of the Society, according to rules printed in 1909, was "the reading and discussion of English poetry and drama". The Society membership is made up of both undergraduate and graduate students at Selwyn College. Female students have been able to join the society since women were admitted to the college. The total number of Controversialist members is not allowed to exceed twelve. Meetings have traditionally been held on Sundays in the Michaelmas and Lent terms, as well as in May if a quorum of five members can be arranged. The badge and symbol of the Controversialists is a purple lyre.

The Controversialists commonly organise smoking concerts where poetry and verse is recited by members before the political discussions begin. The Controversialists are said to drink only Port during their meetings.

The Templars
The Selwyn College Templars are the second oldest secret society and the largest at the college. The society was initially only open to wealthy, upper-class Anglican students. The membership of the Templars Society are often involved with campus politics and are often members of the Cambridge University Conservative Association. Membership is decided by nomination from two current members and election at the society's Michaelmas meeting. New members of the Templars are reportedly 'knighted' with a ceremonial sword in a bizarre initiation ceremony that takes place on the Autumn equinox each year.

In 2014, British newspapers reported that the Selwyn Templars Society were involved in a scandal where sexist and misogynistic messages were sent to members of the society. The college took disciplinary action against all students involved in the incident.

Hermes Club
The Hermes Club, founded in 1920, exists to encourage, fund and improve sport at Selwyn College – a task it accomplishes by offering financial grants to individual sportsmen/women and college teams, through the lobbying of college, and by generally raising the profile of sport in Selwyn. Members of Selwyn are eligible for invitation to the club if they have been awarded a Full Blue or Half Blue by the university, if they have captained a Selwyn College team in a 'First Class sport', or if they have competed on behalf of Selwyn in two 'First Class' Cuppers competitions.

Alumni of the club fund two major sports grant schemes which award thousands of pounds in grants every year – the Hermes Fund and the Vickerstaff Sports Bursary Scheme. Many members of the Hermes Club have gone on to become prominent in public life, particularly as politicians, actors and authors.

Winter and May balls

Selwyn is unique among Oxbridge colleges in that it holds an annual Winter Ball known as the Selwyn Snowball, which traditionally takes place on the night of the last Friday of Michaelmas term. In recent years the Snowball has developed into a larger event than it had been in the mid-nineties and now runs three full stages, with recent headliners including Mumford & Sons and Tinchy Stryder, and caters for around 850 guests. The Selwyn Snowball has often become bigger and more subscribed than its May Ball which is usually held in June of each year once students have finished their examinations.

The May Ball tradition at Selwyn began on 14 June 1948, as hundreds of students dressed in black tie to attend the all-night celebration. May Balls continued to be held at the college throughout the second half of the 20th century with a highlight being the performance of The Who in 1967. In recent years, May Balls have been replaced by the Snowball with notable exceptions: 2008, to celebrate the college's 125th anniversary; 2015 and 2017.

Selwyn College Boat Club

The Selwyn College Boat Club (SCBC) is the rowing club for members of the college. The boat club was founded in 1882, during the Michaelmas term. During this early period, the Selwyn Boat Club trained several rowers who would go on to become Olympic Rowers and University Blues in the annual boat race against Oxford. The SCBC also achieved intercollegiate success during its early days, winning a second in the Lent Bumps of 1934 and third in the May Bumps 1931. The dedication and work of the early Selwyn rowers was all the more fitting given that George Augustus Selwyn had rowed for Cambridge in the first Boat Race at Henley-on-Thames in 1829. The SCBC still has one of the highest participation rates of novice rowers of any Oxbridge college.  Notable alumni of the Selwyn College Boat Club include Hugh Laurie, Tom Hollander and Richard Budgett.

In 2014, Selwyn, King's and Churchill colleges announced plans for a new, state-of-the-art combined boathouse located on the River Cam. The boathouse features double-length beams and extensive gym and training facilities for all Selwyn College rowers and student athletes. This facility was completed in 2015–16 and now provides world-class rowing and training facilities for SCBC rowers and students across the University of Cambridge. The project was largely funded by donations and contributions from alumni and the Hermes Club. The two-storey combined boathouse is larger than its 1968 predecessor and provides facilities for socialising, training and boat maintenance in addition to an observation deck. The combined boathouse was designed by RHP Architects at a cost of approximately £2.20 million and was the winner of the 2017 RIBA East Award for Outstanding Architecture.

In popular culture

In Tom Sharpe's Porterhouse Blue novel, Selwyn College is satirically described as a college founded by 'social justice' devotees. However, the reference does not occur in the Channel 4 television adaption of Porterhouse Blue. In the sequel, Grantchester Grind,  Selwyn is described as an "academic forcing-house", as compared with the lax academic standards of the fictional Porterhouse College.
Selwyn College features in several scenes from the 2014 film The Theory of Everything which portrays the life of physicist Stephen Hawking.

Gallery

Notable alumni

See also
Fellows of Selwyn College, Cambridge
List of Masters of Selwyn College, Cambridge
List of organ scholars
Selwyn House School

References

External links

Selwyn College JCR Committee
Selwyn College MCR
Selwyn Snowball
A new court for Selwyn (University of Cambridge press release, 22 September 2005)
Official Selwyn College Boat Club
Selwyn Alumni

 
Educational institutions established in 1882
Colleges of the University of Cambridge
1882 establishments in England